Ujeździec Mały  is a village in the administrative district of Gmina Trzebnica, within Trzebnica County, Lower Silesian Voivodeship, in south-western Poland. Prior to 1945 it was in Germany.

The settlement is home to the headquarters of the Tarczyński Group, a meat produce joint-stock company founded in 1989 in Sułów.

References

Villages in Trzebnica County